High Yellow is a 1965 film written and directed by Larry Buchanan. Its story concerns a black girl who tries to pass for white.

Plot
Cynthia Wood is a 17-year-old, light-skinned black girl. She tries to pass as white after being hired by wealthy movie magnate, Mr. Langley.

References

External links

1965 films
1965 drama films
Films directed by Larry Buchanan
1960s English-language films